The 1978 Major League Baseball All-Star Game was the 49th midseason exhibition between the all-stars of the American League (AL) and the National League (NL), the two leagues comprising Major League Baseball. The game was played on July 11, 1978, at San Diego Stadium in San Diego, home of the San Diego Padres of the National League. The game resulted in a 7–3 victory for the NL.

This was the first All-Star Game to be played in San Diego.  It would return in 1992 to be played in the same stadium, though it was renamed Jack Murphy Stadium by that time.

The honorary captains were Brooks Robinson (for the AL) and Eddie Mathews (for the NL).

American League roster
The American League roster included 9 future Hall of Fame players, denoted by italics.

Elected starters

Pitchers

Reserve position players

Coaching staff

National League roster
The National League roster included 8 future Hall of Fame players, denoted by italics.

Elected starters

Pitchers

Reserve position players

Coaching staff

Game

Umpires

Starting lineups
While the starters were elected by the fans, the batting orders and starting pitchers were selected by the managers.

Game summary

The American League opened the scoring immediately off of NL starter Vida Blue.  Rod Carew tripled, and scored when George Brett doubled.  Brett advanced to third base on a Jim Rice ground out.  Richie Zisk walked.  Fisk hit a sacrifice fly to Joe Morgan, permitting Brett to score.

The AL added another run in the top of the third inning, again started by a Rod Carew lead off triple.  George Brett followed up with a sacrifice fly to George Foster that allowed Carew to score and extend the AL lead to 3–0.

The lead was very short lived as the NL tied the game in the bottom of the third inning.  Larry Bowa singled.  With Reggie Smith pinch hitting for Vida Blue, Bowa stole second base.  Smith struck out.  Pete Rose grounded out, moving Bowa to third base.  Joe Morgan walked.  George Foster walked, pushing Morgan to second base;  loading the bases.  Greg Luzinski walked sending Foster to second base, Morgan to third base, and scoring Bowa.  Steve Garvey singled, scoring Morgan and Foster, and sending Luzinski to second base.  AL manager Billy Martin replaced starting pitcher Jim Palmer with relief pitcher Matt Keough, though no further scoring occurred.

The score remained tied at three until the bottom of the eighth inning, when Goose Gossage came in to pitch for the AL.  Steve Garvey led off the inning with a triple, and scored when Gossage threw a wild pitch with Dave Concepción batting.  Concepción walked.  Dave Winfield singled sending Concepción to third, with Winfield advancing to second on an error by Chet Lemon.  Bob Boone singled, scoring Concepción and Winfield.  Boone advanced to second when Ron Cey grounded out.  Davey Lopes singled, scoring Boone and ending the scoring for a 7–3 NL victory.

Game notes and records
Bruce Sutter was credited with the win.  Goose Gossage was charged  with the loss.

The two triples hit by Rod Carew, and the one hit by Steve Garvey marked the first time that three triples had been hit in a single All-Star Game.

References

External links
 1978 All-Star Game summary @baseball-reference.com
 1978 All-Star Game summary @baseball almanac.com
 1978 All-Star Game box score @baseball almanac.com
 1978 All-Star Game play by play @baseball almanac.com

Major League Baseball All-Star Game
Major League Baseball All-Star Game
Baseball competitions in San Diego
Major League Baseball All Star Game
July 1978 sports events in the United States